Aunt Hilda may refer to:
 Aunt Hilda!, a 2013 French animated film
 Hilda Spellman, an Archie comics character